We Are Family (original title:  C'est quoi cette famille ?!) is a 2016 French comedy film directed by Gabriel Julien-Laferrière.

Plot 
The family of thirteen-year-old Bastien is anything but conventional. With several marriages and divorces of both parents, Bastien found himself caught in the middle of "a number of parents" and many other half-siblings. This means many bedrooms where he and other kids spend a few nights before packing up and moving to another parent's home. But Bastien has had enough of the arrangement. Eventually he comes up with an innovative idea where the kids will live together in one place and it will now be the adults who are doing the weekly rotations.

Cast

Grandparents 
 Chantal Ladesou: Aurore, the mother of Sophie and Agnès, and the grandmother of Bastien, Clara, Gulliver, Léopoldine and Juliette

Parents 
Julie Gayet: Sophie, the daughter of Aurore, the sister of Agnès, and the mother of Bastien, Clara and Gulliver
Thierry Neuvic : Philippe, the first husband of Sophie, and the father of Bastien and Oscar
Nino Kirtadze: Mavonderine, the ex-wife of Philippe, and the mother of Oscar
Philippe Katerine: Claude, the second husband of Sophie, and the father of Clara
Lucien Jean-Baptiste: Hugo, the third husband of Sophie, and the father of Gulliver and of Eliott
Claudia Tagbo: Babette, the ex-wife of Hugo, and the mother of Eliott
Julie Depardieu: Agnès, the daughter of Aurore, the sister of Sophie, and the mother of Léopoldine and Juliette
Arié Elmatheh: Paul, the first husband of Agnès, and the father of Léopoldine

Children 
 Lilian Dugois: Oscar, the son of Mavonderine and Philippe
 Teïlo Azaïs: Bastien, the son of Sophie and Philippe
 Violette Guillon: Clara, the daughter of Sophie and Claude
 Sadio Diallo: Gulliver, the son of Sophie and Hugo
 Benjamin Douba-Paris: Eliott, the son of Babette and Hugo
 Luna Aglat: Léopoldine, the daughter of Agnès and Paul
 Chann Aglat: Juliette, the daughter of Agnès

Others 
 Antoine Khorsand: Best friend of Bastien
 Louvia Bachelier: Alice, the friend of Bastien
 Caterina Murino: Marie, the mother of Alice
 Serge Onteniente: Victor, the neighbour
 Alain de Catuela: Apartment buyer
 Cécithe Rebboah: Teacher of Gulliver
 Olivier de Benoist: Friend of Babette
 Manon Bresch: Friend of Oscar

References

External links 
 

2016 films
2016 comedy films
2010s French-language films
French comedy films
Films about dysfunctional families
Films directed by Gabriel Julien-Laferrière
2010s French films